Cabharstadh or Caversta is a village on the Isle of Lewis in the Outer Hebrides, Scotland. Caversta is situated in the district of Pairc, and is within the parish of Lochs.

References

External links

Canmore - Lewis, Caversta site record

Villages in the Isle of Lewis